Jake Shears (born October 3, 1978) is an American singer and songwriter. He is best known as the male lead singer of pop-rock band Scissor Sisters.

Early life
Shears was born in Mesa, Arizona, the son of an entrepreneur father and a Baptist mother (Freida Sellards). He grew up on San Juan Island, Washington, where he attended school at Friday Harbor High School and was bullied. His "first real concert was Siouxsie and the Banshees". At the age of 18, he moved into a dorm at the Northwest School in Seattle, Washington, to finish high school. Shears later attended Occidental College in Los Angeles, California. At the age of 19, he traveled to Lexington, Kentucky, to visit a classmate, who introduced him to Scott Hoffman. Shears and Hoffman hit it off immediately and moved to New York a year later.

Career

Early work
Shears attended New York's Eugene Lang College of Liberal Arts, where he studied fiction writing and was a classmate of Travis Jeppesen. He also wrote pieces for the gay magazine HX. In 2000, he worked as a music reviewer for Paper magazine.

Scissor Sisters
Shears and Hoffman formed Scissor Sisters in 2001 as a performance art stunt, playing outrageous shows in clubs like Luxx, the heart of the electroclash scene in Williamsburg, Brooklyn, where Shears lived. After a couple years struggling in New York (working with the record label A Touch of Class, who produced "Comfortably Numb" and "Filthy/Gorgeous"), Scissor Sisters finally found success in the United Kingdom and Ireland, ending 2004 with the biggest-selling album of the year in the UK. In concert, Shears is known for provocative dancing, flamboyant outfits, and near nudity. (During his early years while he was struggling to make it in New York, he would often earn extra money as a Go-go dancer and male erotic dancer at male strip clubs.)

Shears' musical influences include The Bee Gees, Leo Sayer, ABBA, Blondie, David Bowie, Duran Duran, Roxy Music, The New York Dolls, Queen, Cher, Cyndi Lauper, Madonna, Paul McCartney, Pet Shop Boys, The Beatles, and Dolly Parton. The Scissor Sisters video for Filthy/Gorgeous was directed by John Cameron Mitchell after Shears met him at a gathering of the Radical Faeries. Shears attended Sir Elton John's "stag" party before John's civil partnership ceremony with David Furnish in 2005. John and Shears discussed each other in The Observer in 2006.

Other work
Shears performed with Erasure's Andy Bell on "Thought It Was You", on Bell's 2005 album Electric Blue. He has also collaborated with Tiga on "Hot in Herre", "You Gonna Want Me", and "What You Need" from Tiga's album Ciao!. He also worked on Finnish house musician Luomo's "If I Can't". Together with Babydaddy, he co-wrote with Kylie Minogue on her hit single "I Believe in You" for her greatest hits compilation Ultimate Kylie. Shears and Minogue also co-wrote "Too Much" with Calvin Harris for Minogue's number one album Aphrodite. In 2011, Shears collaborated with John Garden to write the music for a musical version of the book Tales of the City. The show is directed by Jason Moore. Shears was featured on the track "Metemya" of Amadou and Mariam's 2012 album Folila. Shears also wrote the foreword to the award-winning '80s 7-inch vinyl cover art book Put the Needle on the Record. In 2013, he appeared on the Queens of the Stone Age album ...Like Clockwork, providing backing vocals on the song "Keep Your Eyes Peeled". He duetted with Cher on the track "Take it Like a Man" for her 2013 album Closer to the Truth.

In October 2017, Shears released his first song as a solo artist, "Creep City".

In January 2018, Shears made his Broadway debut starring in Kinky Boots. The next month Shears published his autobiography, Boys Keep Swinging. Shears released his eponymous debut solo album on August 10, 2018.

In March 2019 Shears toured with Kylie Minogue as part of her Golden Tour.

In January 2020 he appeared as the "Unicorn" on ITV's The Masked Singer, finishing in 6th place. Shears released the single "Meltdown" in February 2020.

Personal life
Shears came out as gay to his parents at the age of 15 at the urging of Dan Savage, who later called his advice "the worst I've ever given" due to the negative reaction of Shears' parents. In 2010, Shears participated in Savage's It Gets Better Project. In 2012, Shears was interviewed about his experience. He spoke about his good friend Anderson Cooper and said he felt gay celebrities "at least have the responsibility to come out". Shears was in a relationship with Chris Moukarbel from 2004 to 2015. At Brighton Pride 2022, Shears announced live that he had received a 5-year visa to live in the UK.

Awards and nominations
{| class="wikitable"
|+ Awards and nominations for Jake Shears
! Year !! Awards !! Work !! Category !! Result !! Ref. 
|-
| 2007
| Virgin Media Music Awards
| Himself
| Most Fanciable Male
| 
| 
|-
| 2018
|Best Art Vinyl
|Jake Shears
| Best Art Vinyl
| 
| 
|-
| 2019
| Classic Pop Readers' Awards
| Boys Keep Swinging
| Book of the Year
| 
| 
|-
| 2022
| Berlin Music Video Awards
| "All I Want"
| Best Director
| 
|

Discography

Albums

Extended plays

Singles

Tours
Supporting act
 Kylie Minogue – Golden Tour (2019)

See also

 LGBT culture in New York City
 List of LGBT people from New York City

References

External links
Official Scissor Sisters website

Shear Madness – Out Magazine interview with Shears

1978 births
Living people
21st-century American male singers
21st-century American singers
American rock singers
American tenors
Countertenors
American gay musicians
Ivor Novello Award winners
Gay singers
Gay songwriters
Gay dancers
LGBT people from Arizona
American LGBT singers
American LGBT songwriters
Occidental College alumni
Radical Faeries members
Scissor Sisters members
Singers from Arizona
20th-century American LGBT people
21st-century American LGBT people
American gay writers